Mandi Bamora railway station is located in Bina-etawa district of Madhya Pradesh and serves Mandi Bamora town. Its code is "MABA". Passenger, Express, and Superfast trains halt here.

Trains

The following trains halt at Mandi Bamora railway station in both directions:

 Bhopal–Khajuraho Mahamana Superfast Express
 Rewa–Dr. Ambedkar Nagar Express
 Vindhyachal Express
 Bhopal–Damoh Rajya Rani Express
 Dakshin Express
 Chhattisgarh Express
 Mumbai CST–Amritsar Express
 Somnath–Jabalpur Express (via Bina)
 Rewanchal Express

References

Railway stations in Sagar district
Bhopal railway division